Austin Taylor may refer to:
 Austin Taylor (British politician) (1858–1955), British Conservative Party politician, MP for Liverpool East Toxteth 1902–1910
 Austin Claude Taylor (1893–1964), Canadian farmer and politician
 Austin Cotterell Taylor Canadian industrialist
 Ted Taylor (musician), soul musician born Austin Taylor
 Austin Taylor (10 pin Bowler), Best under 22s 10 pin bowler in the United Kingdom